Lurup is a quarter in the Altona borough of the Free and Hanseatic city of Hamburg in northern Germany. It was formerly an independent village. In 2020 the population was 36,521.

History
In 1927 Lurup was merged with Altona, and in 1938 it was merged with Altona into Hamburg with the Greater Hamburg Act.

Geography
In 2006 according to the statistical office of Hamburg and Schleswig-Holstein, the quarter Lurup has a total area of 6.4 km².

The western border is formed by the railway tracks of the city train to the district of Eidelstedt, part of the borough Eimsbüttel. In the North, Lurup borders the state of Schleswig-Holstein and in the East it connects to the district of Osdorf, partially marked by the small stream of Luruper Moorgraben. In the South, Lurup borders the district of Bahrenfeld.

Demographics
In 2016 the population of Lurup was 36,053. Average annual income was 26.665 Euro.

In 2006 there were 3,035 criminal offences (91 crimes per 1000 people).

Population by year
The population is counted by the residential registration office for 31 December each year.

Education
There are five elementary schools and six secondary schools in Lurup, totalling 3,343 students.

Culture

Sports
The sports club SV Lurup has a stadium at Flurstraße.

Infrastructure

Health systems
Lurup comprises 22 day care centers for children, 32 private medical offices and five pharmacies.

Transportation
Lurup is serviced by the rapid transit system of the city train with the station Elbgaustrasse close to Eidelstedt. Public transport in Lurup is also provided by several bus lines. Between 1955 and 1973 Lurup was connected to the Hamburg tram (Lines 1 and 11).

According to the Department of Motor Vehicles (Kraftfahrt-Bundesamt), 11,707 private cars were registered (353 cars/1000 people). 152 traffic accidents were recorded, including 121 traffic accidents with damage to persons.

Notes

References

 Statistical office Hamburg and Schleswig-Holstein Statistisches Amt für Hamburg und Schleswig-Holstein, official website

External links

Socially Integrative City: An Initial Appraisal, 2002, Hamburg - Altona-Lurup - Bundestransferstelle Soziale Stadt

Quarters of Hamburg
Altona, Hamburg